Rafael Schächter (born 25 May 1905, died on the death march during the evacuation of Auschwitz in 1945),   was a Czechoslovak composer, pianist and conductor of Jewish  origin, organizer of cultural life in Terezín concentration camp.

Life 

He came from Romanian town Brăila, but after World War I he came to Brno, where he studied piano at Vilém Kurz. He moved to Prague with Kurz and started to study piano at master school with Karel Hoffmeister, and composition and conducting at Prague Conservatory. After he finished studies, he was engaged (in 1934) to avant-garde theatre Déčko by E. F. Burian.
In 1937 he established own ensemble—Komorní opera, where he performed lesser-known chamber and also baroque music.

After the German occupation of Czechoslovakia in 1939, the Nazi administration began a program of mass incarceration, deportation, and genocide of the 100,000+ Jewish people there, including the establishment of the Theresienstadt ghetto and concentration camp in the Czech town of Terezín. Schächter was sent to Terezín on 30 November 1941 in Transport H, serial number 128. Here he set up a smuggled piano in the basement of the men's barracks housing. Without the constant oversight of Nazi soldiers within the camp, Schächter was able to assemble a male choir to keep morale high. He also managed to slip by the barred gates of the men's section to the woman's barracks to assemble a female choir there as well. When the genders were reintegrated by the Nazis, Schächter's established choir was able to gain clemency from the camp director. With his choir, which numbered well in excess of 200 members, he was able to create, often from a single score, productions of famous operas and works of classical music.

The first opera performed in Terezín was The Bartered Bride by Bedřich Smetana. Schächter rehearsed the performance only with piano and improvised choir and solos, but it was subjected to great acclaim. The initial performance took place on 25 November 1942 without permission from the Freizeitgestaltung (Administration of Free Time Activities), but the concert opera was so well received that it was shown to administration and approved for an official premiere on 28 November 1942. The performance was reprised many times.Schächter also staged performances of Smetana operaThe Kiss, Mozart's The Marriage of Figaro and The Magic Flute, and Pergolesi's La Serva Padrona. 

Schächter also led approximately sixteen performances of Verdi's Requiem and reportedly taught the 150 member choir their parts by rote. It is estimated that the first performance occurred in  January 1942, with a chorus of 150 and a piano for accompaniment. Over the following months, even as his choir shrank, the Requiem was performed approximately 15 additional times. The final performance, however, served as propaganda as Schächter was forced to perform excerpts of the oratorio before visiting members of the International Red Cross and Schutzstaffel (S.S.).

A few months after this final performance, on 16 October 1944, under transport 943, Schächter was loaded into a rail road cattle car with approximately 1,000 other prisoners. They were transported during a 3-day journey to the infamous Auschwitz camp. According to a survivor's account, he later went to three more death camps and died in the last.

References

Bibliography 
Kuna, Milan: Hudba vzdoru a naděje. Terezín 1941-1945. Praha: Editio Bärenreiter, 2000. H 7822 
Šormová, Eva: Divadlo v Terezíně 1941/1945. Památník Terezín, 1973. 
 - Czech novel about Rafael Schächter

External links 
 Documents about Rafael Schächter in the collection of the Jewish Museum Prague
 Jewish-theatre.com
 Raphael Schächter - Music and the Holocaust

1905 births
1945 deaths
20th-century composers
20th-century conductors (music)
20th-century pianists
20th-century Czech male musicians
Czech composers
Czech male composers
Czech pianists
Czech conductors (music)
Jewish composers
Male conductors (music)
Male pianists
People from Brăila
Czech Jews who died in the Holocaust
Czech people who died in Auschwitz concentration camp
Czechoslovak civilians killed in World War II
Theresienstadt Ghetto prisoners